Glyphipterix octatoma is a species of sedge moth in the genus Glyphipterix. It was described by Alexey Diakonoff in 1978. It is found in China.

References

Moths described in 1978
Glyphipterigidae
Moths of Asia